Moti Nagar Assembly constituency is one of the seventy Delhi assembly constituencies of Delhi in northern India.
Moti Nagar assembly constituency is a part of New Delhi (Lok Sabha constituency).

Members of Legislative Assembly
Key

Election results

2020

2015

2013

2008

2004 By Election results

2003

1998

1993

References

Assembly constituencies of Delhi
Delhi Legislative Assembly